Neşat Gülünoğlu (born 4 January 1979) is a German-born Turkish former football forward.

References

External links
 
 

1979 births
Living people
People from Herne, North Rhine-Westphalia
Sportspeople from Arnsberg (region)
German people of Turkish descent
Turkish footballers
Turkish expatriate footballers
Turkey under-21 international footballers
Expatriate footballers in Germany
Expatriate footballers in Italy
Bundesliga players
Süper Lig players
VfL Bochum players
A.S. Roma players
Sportfreunde Siegen players
SV Waldhof Mannheim players
SC Westfalia Herne players
Kocaelispor footballers
Association football forwards
Footballers from North Rhine-Westphalia